Jan Francisci (14 June 169127 April 1758) was an organist and composer born in Neusohl, Kingdom of Hungary (now Banská Bystrica, Slovakia). In 1709, he succeeded his father as cantor there before going to Vienna in 1722. He visited J.S. Bach in Leipzig in 1725. He worked as a church musician in (Pressburg) (now Bratislava) until 1735, when he returned to Neusohl. He remained there until his death, except for the years 1743–1748.

References
Oxford Composer Companions, J.S. Bach, 1999, p. 176

1691 births
1758 deaths
Slovak composers
Male composers
Hungarian Baroque composers
Musicians from Banská Bystrica
18th-century classical composers
18th-century male musicians
18th-century musicians
Hungarian male classical composers
Hungarian classical composers
Slovak male musicians